Lucia Mokrášová (born 27 March 1994 in Trenčín) is a Slovak athlete who specialises in the heptathlon.

Achievements

References

External links 
 

1994 births
Living people
Sportspeople from Trenčín
Slovak heptathletes
Athletes (track and field) at the 2015 European Games
European Games silver medalists for Slovakia
European Games medalists in athletics
Competitors at the 2017 Summer Universiade